Truliant Federal Credit Union is a nonprofit financial institution based in Winston-Salem, North Carolina. Chartered in 1952, the credit union provides financial guidance and services to members in North Carolina, South Carolina and Virginia. As of September 2021, Truliant has more than 280,000 members and $3.6 billion in assets.

History 
In 1952, Truliant Federal Credit Union was chartered as the Radio Shops Credit Union to serve employees of Western Electric in Winston-Salem, Greensboro, and Burlington. It was renamed North Carolina Works Federal Credit Union, then AT&T Family Federal Credit Union in 1983 with the goal of servicing employees of the telecommunications company.

AT&T Family Federal Credit Union expanded its services beginning in 1987 to include employee groups at Krispy Kreme, Polo Ralph Lauren and other companies. The American Bankers Association and five commercial banks sued AT&T Family Federal Credit Union in 1990 for expanding its membership to 150 employee groups nationwide, claiming the expansion violated the 1934 Federal Credit Union Act, which states members of a credit union must have a “common bond.” The U.S. Court of Appeals agreed, ruling against AT&T Family Credit Union in October 1996. The National Credit Union Administration appealed the ruling; it then went to the Supreme Court, which voted 5 to 4 against AT&T Family Credit Union and other regional credit unions, saying it violated the 1934 law. But President Bill Clinton signed a law in 1998 allowing AT&T Family Credit Union and all other credit unions to provide service to multiple groups.

In 1999, the credit union changed its name to Truliant. Truliant merged with Victory Masonic Credit Union, a historically African-American credit union in North Carolina, in 2004.

Todd Hall was named president and CEO of Truliant in January 2020.

As of 2022, Truliant has 34 branches in Virginia, North Carolina and South Carolina and more than 280,000 members.

References

External links
 

Credit unions based in North Carolina
Banks established in 1952
Companies based in Winston-Salem, North Carolina
1952 establishments in North Carolina